Trioceros is a genus of lizards in the family Chamaeleonidae. Trioceros was considered a subgenus of the genus Chamaeleo until 2009, when it was elevated to full genus level. As of 2021, Trioceros wolfgangboehmei is the last known species in its genus.

Species and subspecies
The following species and subspecies are recognized as being valid.

Nota bene: In the above list, a binomial authority or trinomial authority in parentheses indicates that the species or subspecies was originally described in a genus other than Trioceros.

Footnotes

References

  (2011). The Eponym Dictionary of Reptiles. Baltimore: Johns Hopkins University Press. xiii + 296 pp. .
  (2009). "A re-appraisal of the systematics of the African genus Chamaeleo (Reptilia: Chamaeleonidae)". Zootaxa 2079: 57–68.
  (1839). The Natural History of Fishes, Amphibians, & Reptiles, or Monocardian Animals. Vol. II. London: Longman, Orme, Brown, Green & Longmans; John Taylor. (A. Spottiswoode, printer). 452 pp. (Trioceros, new genus, p. 369).

External links
 http://www.chameleoninfo.com/Species_Profiles.html

 
Lizard genera
Taxa named by William John Swainson